Jerry Lyle Pettis (July 18, 1916 – February 14, 1975) was an American politician and a four-term Congressman from California from 1967 to 1975. He was also a rancher, teacher, aviator, religious leader, and businessman. Pettis was the first Seventh Day Adventist elected to Congress.

Political career
In 1966, he was elected as a Republican to the U.S. House of Representatives, and he was re-elected in 1968, 1970, 1972 and 1974. He represented California's 33rd Congressional District until January 1975 and its 37th Congressional District thereafter.

Background and personal life
Educated in Arizona and California, he graduated from Pacific Union College in Angwin, California in 1938. He did graduate work at the University of Southern California and the University of Denver in 1939-1941 before becoming a businessman. He served in the United States Army Air Forces during World War II and was a pilot for United Airlines.

He was a Seventh-day Adventist.

Death and legacy
Pettis was killed on February 14, 1975, when the Beechcraft Model V35B Bonanza he was piloting crashed near Cherry Valley, California, after he encountered adverse weather conditions. He is buried at Montecito Memorial Park in Colton, California.

Pettis's wife, Shirley Neil Pettis, replaced him in the House when she won a special election on April 29, 1975.

The Jerry Pettis Memorial Veterans Administration Hospital in Loma Linda, California, was so named in his honor. His congressional papers are located in the Archives & Special Collections at Loma Linda University.

During the 1970s, the Jerry L. Pettis Memorial Scholarship was established and is awarded by the American Medical Association Foundation to "students pursuing careers in science communications".

See also
 List of United States Congress members who died in office (1950–99)

References

External links

Entry in the Biographical Directory of Congress
President Ford's statement on the occasion of his death 

University of Denver alumni
Pacific Union College alumni
1916 births
1975 deaths
Aviators killed in aviation accidents or incidents in the United States
University of Southern California alumni
Accidental deaths in California
American Seventh-day Adventists
Republican Party members of the United States House of Representatives from California
United States Army Air Forces pilots of World War II
20th-century American politicians
Victims of aviation accidents or incidents in 1975